The 2014 Qatar Cup, more widely known as the Crown Prince Cup, was the twentieth in the series, and took place from April 19 to 26. The cup was contested by the top four finishers in 2013–14 Qatar Stars League. 2014 was the first year in which Al-Sailiya participated.

2014 Participants
 Lekhwiya : 2013–14 Qatar Stars League champions
 El Jaish : 2013–14 Qatar Stars League runners up
 Al-Sadd : 2013–14 Qatar Stars League third place
 Al-Sailiya : 2013–14 Qatar Stars League 4th place

Bracket

Match details

Semi-finals

Final

References

Qatar Crown Prince Cup
Qatar Crown Prince Cup
Crown Prince Cup